Dnyanraj Chougule  is a Shiv Sena politician from Osmanabad district. He is Member of the Legislative Assembly from Umarga Vidhan Sabha constituency of Osmanabad District, Maharashtra, India as a member of Shiv Sena. He has been elected consecutively for 3 terms in the Maharashtra Legislative Assembly for 2009, 2014 and 2019.

Positions held
 2009: Elected to Maharashtra Legislative Assembly
 2014: Re-elected to Maharashtra Legislative Assembly
 2019: Re-elected to Maharashtra Legislative Assembly

See also
 Lohara
 Umarga

References

External links
  Shivsena Home Page 

Living people
Shiv Sena politicians
Maharashtra MLAs 2009–2014
Maharashtra MLAs 2014–2019
People from Osmanabad district
Year of birth missing (living people)
Place of birth missing (living people)
Marathi politicians